Victor Nechayev (born January 28, 1955) is a Russian former professional ice hockey player who played three games for the Los Angeles Kings in the National Hockey League. He was the first player from the Soviet Union to play in the NHL, as well as the first to score a goal.

A native of Siberia, Nechayev met Cheryl Haigler, an American citizen, in Switzerland in 1976, while he was playing for the Red Army team. They married in 1980 in Leningrad. In April 1982, Nechayev was granted permission to join his wife in the United States.

In the 1982 NHL Entry Draft, Nechayev was picked 132nd overall by the Kings. Unlike other Soviet players, Nechayev was able to join the team immediately, since he was already living in North America at the time he was drafted. He scored his only NHL goal against the New York Rangers on October 17, 1982.

Career statistics

References

External links
 

1955 births
Düsseldorfer EG players
HC Sibir Novosibirsk players
Living people
Los Angeles Kings draft picks
Los Angeles Kings players
New Haven Nighthawks players
People from Belogorsk, Amur Oblast
Saginaw Gears players
SKA Saint Petersburg players
Soviet ice hockey forwards
Sportspeople from Amur Oblast